Reşat is a Turkish given name for males. People named Reşat include:

 Reşat Çağlar, Cypriot diplomat
 Reşat Nuri Güntekin, Turkish novelist
 Reşat Ekrem Koçu, Turkish historian
 Reşat Mursaloğlu, Turkish politician

Turkish masculine given names

de:Reşat